Kevin Hamblin is a curler from Morris, Manitoba. Hamblin was the 2002 Manitoba, Canadian, and World Junior Curling Champion as he played second on the team that his brother David Hamblin had skipped. That 2002 team was then inducted into the Manitoba Curling Association Hall of Fame in 2006.

References

External links
 

Curlers from Manitoba
People from Morris, Manitoba
Living people
Canadian male curlers
Year of birth missing (living people)